The 2002–03 Milwaukee Panthers men's basketball team represented the University of Wisconsin–Milwaukee during the 2002–03 NCAA Division I men's basketball season. The Panthers, led by 2nd-year head coach Bruce Pearl, played their home games at the U.S. Cellular Arena and Klotsche Center and were members of the Horizon League. They finished the season 24–8, 13–3 in Horizon League play to finish in second place. They were champions of the Horizon League tournament to earn an automatic bid to the NCAA tournament where they received a No. 12 seed in the Midwest region. Their season ended after losing a one-point game to No. 5 seed Notre Dame in the opening round.

Roster

Schedule and results 

|-
!colspan=9 style=| Regular season

|-
!colspan=9 style=| Horizon League Tournament

|-
!colspan=9 style=| NCAA Tournament

Rankings

Awards and honors
Bruce Pearl – Horizon League Coach of the Year

References 

 2002-03 Milwaukee Panthers Schedule and Results

Milwaukee
Milwaukee Panthers men's basketball seasons
Milwaukee